The 2022 World Seniors Darts Championship (known for sponsorship reasons as the 2022 JENNINGSbet World Seniors Darts Championship) was the first World Seniors Darts Championship organised by the World Seniors Darts Tour and was held at the Circus Tavern in Purfleet between 3 and 6 February 2022.

The event was open to players over the age of 50, and was a joint venture between MODUS Sports and Jason Francis, which organised Snooker Legends and World Seniors Championship of Snooker in 2017–18.

Target Darts were announced as one of the leading sponsors for the 2022 World Seniors Darts Championship. The World Seniors Darts Championship was broadcast in United Kingdom, Germany, Ireland, Austria and Switzerland.

Robert Thornton became the inaugural champion, defeating Martin Adams 5–1 in the final.

Prize money
The prize fund for the event was £72,500, with £30,000 going to the champion.

Qualifiers
The first player announced to take part in the event on 3 April 2021 was 16-time world champion Phil Taylor.

The 24-player field comprised 11 former PDC and BDO World Champions, plus a further 11 invited players. Two further places were completed by a qualifying event which took place 13–14 November 2021 at The Crucible Club in Reading. Current PDC Tour Card holders were ineligible, ruling out world champions Richie Burnett, Peter Wright, Gary Anderson, Raymond van Barneveld, Steve Beaton, Glen Durrant and Scott Mitchell.

Tony David was invited to the tournament but withdrew due to visa reasons and was replaced by Alan Warriner-Little. Dennis Priestley was also invited to the tournament but he suffered a leg injury. Andy Fordham had also accepted an invite to participate, but he died in July 2021 and was replaced by Deta Hedman. Ted Hankey withdrew in December 2021 and was replaced by Larry Butler. Richie Burnett and Kevin Burness then had to withdraw in January 2022 upon winning PDC Tour Cards. Lisa Ashton (who had subsequently lost hers), and Dave Prins (as the highest ranked non-qualified player from the qualifiers) replaced them.

Invited Seeds
Starting in Second round
  Martin Adams (Runner-up)
  Lisa Ashton (Second round)
  Keith Deller (Second round)
  Trina Gulliver (Second round)
  John Lowe (Second round)
  John Part (Second round)
  Phil Taylor (Quarter-finals)
  Wayne Warren (Second round)

Invited players
Starting in First round
  Bob Anderson (First round)
  Richie Burnett 
  Larry Butler (Quarter-finals)
  Tony David 
  Darryl Fitton (First round)
  Ted Hankey 
  Deta Hedman (First round)
  Terry Jenkins (Semi-finals)
  Paul Lim (First round)
  Peter Manley (Second round)
  Tony O'Shea (First round)
  Kevin Painter (Semi-finals)
  Dennis Priestley
  Roland Scholten (First round)
  Robert Thornton (Champion)
  Les Wallace (First round)
  John Walton (Quarter-finals)
  Alan Warriner-Little (First round)

Qualifiers
Starting in First round
  Kevin Burness
  Richie Howson (Second round)
  Dave Prins (Quarter-finals)

Draw
The draw for the tournament was announced on 18 January 2022.

Statistics

Top averages
This table shows the highest averages achieved by players throughout the tournament.

Representation
This table shows the number of players by country in the 2022 World Seniors Darts Championship. A total of seven nationalities were represented.

Broadcasting rights
BT Sport won the rights to air the championship, and their coverage was Ray Stubbs and Bobby George, with Helen Chamberlain conducting interviews, while commentary duties were covered by Mark Webster, Paul Nicholson, John Gwynne, and Chris Murphy. BBC aired the event via the BBC iPlayer & BBC Sport website and app. In Ireland, Virgin Media Three broadcast the whole tournament with Sport1 covering the tournament in Germany.

References

World Seniors Darts Championship
World Seniors Darts Championship
World Seniors Darts Championship
Senior sports competitions